The International Military Tribunal for the Far East (IMTFE, also the Tokyo Trial and the Tokyo War Crimes Tribunal) was a military trial convened on 29 April 1946 to try leaders of the Empire of Japan for their crimes against peace, conventional war crimes, and crimes against humanity, leading up to and during the Second World War. The IMTFE was modeled after the International Military Tribunal (IMT) at Nuremberg, Germany, which prosecuted the leaders of Nazi Germany for their war crimes, crimes against peace, and crimes against humanity.

Following Japan's defeat and occupation by the Allies, the Supreme Commander of the Allied Powers, United States General Douglas MacArthur, issued a special proclamation establishing the IMTFE. A charter was drafted to establish the court's composition, jurisdiction, procedures; the crimes were defined based on the Nuremberg charter. The Tokyo War Crimes Tribunal was composed of judges, prosecutors, and staff from eleven countries that had fought against Japan: Australia, Canada, China, France, India, the Netherlands, New Zealand, the Philippines, the Soviet Union, the United Kingdom, and the United States; the defense consisted of Japanese and American lawyers.

The Tokyo Trial exercised broader temporal jurisdiction than its counterpart in Nuremberg, beginning from the 1931 Japanese invasion of Manchuria. Twenty-eight high-ranking Japanese military and political leaders were tried by the court, including current and former prime ministers, foreign ministers, and military commanders. They were charged with fifty-five separate counts, including the waging wars of aggression, murder, and various war crimes and crimes against humanity (such as torture and forced labor) against prisoners-of-war, civilian internees, and the inhabitants of occupied territories; ultimately, 45 of the counts, including all the murder charges, were ruled either redundant or not authorized under the IMTFE Charter.

By the time it adjourned on November 12, 1948, two defendants had died of natural causes and one, Shūmei Ōkawa, was ruled unfit to stand trial. All remaining defendants were found guilty of at least one count, of whom seven were sentenced to death and sixteen to life imprisonment. Thousands of other "lesser" war criminals were tried by domestic tribunals convened across Asia and the Pacific by Allied nations, with most concluding by 1949.

However, imperial Japanese leaders responsible for some of the worst war crimes committed in WW2 were not punished. Due to the US government covering up some Japanese war crimes and classifying incriminating evidence, as well as blocking the prosecution access to key witnesses, the trials failed to bring imperial Japanese leaders responsible for Unit 731 to justice.

The Tokyo Trial lasted more than twice as long as the better-known Nuremberg trials, and its impact was similarly influential in the development of international law; similar international war crimes tribunals would not be established until the 1990s.

Background

The Tribunal was established to implement the Cairo Declaration, the Potsdam Declaration, the Instrument of Surrender, and the Moscow Conference. The Potsdam Declaration (July 1945) had stated, "stern justice shall be meted out to all war criminals, including those who have visited cruelties upon our prisoners," though it did not specifically foreshadow trials. The terms of reference for the Tribunal were set out in the IMTFE Charter, issued on January 19, 1946. There was major disagreement, both among the Allies and within their administrations, about whom to try and how to try them. Despite the lack of consensus, General Douglas MacArthur, the Supreme Commander of the Allied Powers, decided to initiate arrests. On September 11, a week after the surrender, he ordered the arrest of 39 suspects—most of them members of General Hideki Tojo's war cabinet. Tojo tried to commit suicide but was resuscitated with the help of U.S. physicians.

Creation of the court

On January 19, 1946, MacArthur issued a special proclamation ordering the establishment of an International Military Tribunal for the Far East (IMTFE). On the same day, he also approved the Charter of the International Military Tribunal for the Far East (CIMTFE), which prescribed how it was to be formed, the crimes that it was to consider, and how the tribunal was to function. The charter generally followed the model set by the Nuremberg trials. On April 25, in accordance with the provisions of Article 7 of the CIMTFE, the original Rules of Procedure of the International Military Tribunal for the Far East with amendments were promulgated.

Tokyo War Crimes Trial

Following months of preparation, the IMTFE convened on April 29, 1946. The trials were held in the War Ministry office in Tokyo.

On May 3 the prosecution opened its case, charging the defendants with crimes against peace, conventional war crimes, and crimes against humanity. The trial continued for more than two and a half years, hearing testimony from 419 witnesses and admitting 4,336 exhibits of evidence, including depositions and affidavits from 779 other individuals.

Charges
Following the model used at the Nuremberg trials in Germany, the Allies established three broad categories. "Class A" charges, alleging crimes against peace, were to be brought against Japan's top leaders who had planned and directed the war. Class B and C charges, which could be leveled at Japanese of any rank, covered conventional war crimes and crimes against humanity, respectively. Unlike the Nuremberg trials, the charge of crimes against peace was a prerequisite to prosecution—only those individuals whose crimes included crimes against peace could be prosecuted by the Tribunal. In the event, no Class C charges were heard in Tokyo.

The indictment accused the defendants of promoting a scheme of conquest that:[C]ontemplated and carried out ... murdering, maiming and ill-treating prisoners of war (and) civilian internees ... forcing them to labor under inhumane conditions ... plundering public and private property, wantonly destroying cities, towns and villages beyond any justification of military necessity; (perpetrating) mass murder, rape, pillage, brigandage, torture and other barbaric cruelties upon the helpless civilian population of the over-run countries.Keenan issued a press statement along with the indictment: "War and treaty-breakers should be stripped of the glamour of national heroes and exposed as what they really are—plain, ordinary murderers."

Evidence and testimony
Any possible evidence that would incriminate Emperor Hirohito and his family was excluded from the International Military Tribunal for the Far East, as the United States believed it needed him to maintain order in Japan and achieve their postwar objectives.

The prosecution began opening statements on May 3, 1946, and took 192 days to present its case, finishing on January 24, 1947. It submitted its evidence in fifteen phases.

The Tribunal embraced the best evidence rule once the Prosecution had rested. The best evidence rule dictates that the "best" or most authentic evidence must be produced (for example, a map instead of a description of the map; an original instead of a copy; and a witness instead of a description of what the witness may have said). Justice Pal, one of two justices to vote for acquittal on all counts, observed, "in a proceeding where we had to allow the prosecution to bring in any amount of hearsay evidence, it was somewhat misplaced caution to introduce this best evidence rule particularly when it operated practically against the defense only."

To prove their case, the prosecution team relied on the doctrine of "command responsibility." This doctrine was that it did not require proof of criminal orders. The prosecution had to prove three things: that war crimes were systematic or widespread; the accused knew that troops were committing atrocities; and the accused had power or authority to stop the crimes.

Part of Article 13 of the Charter provided that evidence against the accused could include any document "without proof of its issuance or signature" as well as diaries, letters, press reports, and sworn or unsworn out-of-court statements relating to the charges. Article 13 of the Charter read, in part: "The tribunal shall not be bound by technical rules of evidence ... and shall admit any evidence which it deems to have probative value.

The prosecution argued that a 1927 document known as the Tanaka Memorial showed that a "common plan or conspiracy" to commit "crimes against peace" bound the accused together. Thus, the prosecution argued that the conspiracy had begun in 1927 and continued through to the end of the war in 1945. The Tanaka Memorial is now considered by most historians to have been an anti-Japanese forgery; however, it was not regarded as such at the time.

Wartime press releases of the Allies were admitted as evidence by the prosecution, while those sought to be entered by the defense were excluded. The recollection of a conversation with a long-dead man was admitted. Letters allegedly written by Japanese citizens were admitted with no proof of authenticity and no opportunity for cross examination by the defense.

Defense
The defendants were represented by over a hundred attorneys, three-quarters of them Japanese and one-quarter American, plus a support staff. The defense opened its case on January 27, 1947, and finished its presentation 225 days later on September 9, 1947.

The defense argued that the trial could never be free from substantial doubt as to its "legality, fairness and impartiality."

The defense challenged the indictment, arguing that crimes against peace, and more specifically, the undefined concepts of conspiracy and aggressive war, had yet to be established as crimes in international law; in effect, the IMTFE was contradicting accepted legal procedure by trying the defendants retroactively for violating laws which had not existed when the alleged crimes had been committed. The defense insisted that there was no basis in international law for holding individuals responsible for acts of state, as the Tokyo Trial proposed to do. The defense attacked the notion of negative criminality, by which the defendants were to be tried for failing to prevent breaches of law and war crimes by others, as likewise having no basis in international law.

The defense argued that Allied Powers' violations of international law should be examined.

Former Foreign Minister Shigenori Tōgō maintained that Japan had had no choice but to enter the war for self-defense purposes. He asserted that "[because of the Hull Note] we felt at the time that Japan was being driven either to war or suicide."

Judgment
After the defense had finished its presentation on September 9, 1947 the IMT spent fifteen months reaching judgment and drafting its 1,781-page opinion. The reading of the judgment and the sentences lasted from December 4 to 12, 1948. Five of the eleven justices released separate opinions outside the court.

In his concurring opinion Justice William Webb of Australia took issue with Emperor Hirohito's legal status, writing, "The suggestion that the Emperor was bound to act on advice is contrary to the evidence." While refraining from personal indictment of Hirohito, Webb indicated that Hirohito bore responsibility as a constitutional monarch who accepted "ministerial and other advice for war" and that "no ruler can commit the crime of launching aggressive war and then validly claim to be excused for doing so because his life would otherwise have been in danger ... It will remain that the men who advised the commission of a crime, if it be one, are in no worse position than the man who directs the crime be committed."

Justice Delfín Jaranilla of the Philippines disagreed with the penalties imposed by the tribunal as being "too lenient, not exemplary and deterrent, and not commensurate with the gravity of the offence or offences committed."

Justice Henri Bernard of France argued that the tribunal's course of action was flawed due to Hirohito's absence and the lack of sufficient deliberation by the judges. He concluded that Japan's declaration of war "had a principal author who escaped all prosecution and of whom in any case the present Defendants could only be considered as accomplices" and that a "verdict reached by a Tribunal after a defective procedure cannot be a valid one."

"It is well-nigh impossible to define the concept of initiating or waging a war of aggression both accurately and comprehensively," wrote Justice Bert Röling of the Netherlands in his dissent. He stated, "I think that not only should there have been neutrals in the court, but there should have been Japanese also." He argued that they would always have been a minority and therefore would not have been able to sway the balance of the trial. However, "they could have convincingly argued issues of government policy which were unfamiliar to the Allied justices." Pointing out the difficulties and limitations in holding individuals responsible for an act of state and making omission of responsibility a crime, Röling called for the acquittal of several defendants, including Hirota.

Justice Radhabinod Pal of India produced a judgment in which he dismissed the legitimacy of the IMTFE as victor's justice: "I would hold that each and every one of the accused must be found not guilty of each and every one of the charges in the indictment and should be acquitted on all those charges." While taking into account the influence of wartime propaganda, exaggerations, and distortions of facts in the evidence, and "over-zealous" and "hostile" witnesses, Pal concluded, "The evidence is still overwhelming that atrocities were perpetrated by the members of the Japanese armed forces against the civilian population of some of the territories occupied by them as also against the prisoners of war."

Sentencing

One defendant, Shūmei Ōkawa, was found mentally unfit for trial and the charges were dropped.

Two defendants, Yōsuke Matsuoka and Osami Nagano, died of natural causes during the trial.

Six defendants were sentenced to death by hanging for war crimes, crimes against humanity, and crimes against peace (Class A, Class B and Class C):
 General Kenji Doihara, chief of the intelligence services in Manchukuo
 Kōki Hirota, prime minister (later foreign minister)
 General Seishirō Itagaki, war minister
 General Heitarō Kimura, commander, Burma Area Army
 Lieutenant General Akira Mutō, chief of staff, 14th Area Army
 General Hideki Tōjō, commander, Kwantung Army (later prime minister)
One defendant was sentenced to death by hanging for war crimes and crimes against humanity (Class B and Class C):
 General Iwane Matsui, commander, Shanghai Expeditionary Force and Central China Area Army

The seven defendants who were sentenced to death were executed at Sugamo Prison in Ikebukuro on December 23, 1948. MacArthur, afraid of embarrassing and antagonizing the Japanese people, defied the wishes of President Truman and barred photography of any kind, instead bringing in four members of the Allied Council to act as official witnesses.

Sixteen defendants were sentenced to life imprisonment. Three (Koiso, Shiratori, and Umezu) died in prison, while the other thirteen were paroled between 1954 and 1956:
 General Sadao Araki, war minister
 Colonel Kingorō Hashimoto, major instigator of the second Sino-Japanese War
 Field Marshal Shunroku Hata, war minister
 Baron Kiichirō Hiranuma, prime minister
 Naoki Hoshino, Chief Cabinet Secretary
 Okinori Kaya, Minister of Finance
 Marquis Kōichi Kido, Lord Keeper of the Privy Seal
 General Kuniaki Koiso, governor-general of Korea, later prime minister
 General Jirō Minami, commander, Kwantung Army, former governor-general of Korea
 Vice Admiral Takazumi Oka, naval minister
 Lieutenant General Hiroshi Ōshima, Ambassador to Germany
 Lieutenant General Kenryō Satō, chief of the Military Affairs Bureau
 Admiral Shigetarō Shimada, naval minister
 Toshio Shiratori, Ambassador to Italy
 Lieutenant General Teiichi Suzuki, president of the Cabinet Planning Board
 General Yoshijirō Umezu, war minister and Chief of the Army General Staff
 Foreign minister Shigenori Tōgō was sentenced to 20 years' imprisonment. Togo died in prison in 1950.
 Foreign minister Mamoru Shigemitsu was sentenced to 7 years and paroled in 1950. He later served as Foreign Minister and as Deputy Prime Minister of post-war Japan.

The verdict and sentences of the tribunal were confirmed by MacArthur on November 24, 1948, two days after a perfunctory meeting with members of the Allied Control Commission for Japan, who acted as the local representatives of the nations of the Far Eastern Commission. Six of those representatives made no recommendations for clemency. Australia, Canada, India, and the Netherlands were willing to see the general make some reductions in sentences. He chose not to do so. The issue of clemency was thereafter to disturb Japanese relations with the Allied powers until the late 1950s, when a majority of the Allied powers agreed to release the last of the convicted major war criminals from captivity.

Other war crimes trials
More than 5,700 lower-ranking personnel were charged with conventional war crimes in separate trials convened by Australia, China, France, the Netherlands Indies, the Philippines, the United Kingdom, and the United States. The charges covered a wide range of crimes including prisoner abuse, rape, sexual slavery, torture, ill-treatment of laborers, execution without trial, and inhumane medical experiments. The trials took place in around fifty locations in Asia and the Pacific. Most trials were completed by 1949, but Australia held some trials in 1951. China held 13 tribunals, resulting in 504 convictions and 149 executions.

Of the 5,700 Japanese individuals indicted for Class B war crimes, 984 were sentenced to death; 475 received life sentences; 2,944 were given more limited prison terms; 1,018 were acquitted; and 279 were never brought to trial or not sentenced. The number of death sentences by country is as follows: the Netherlands 236, United Kingdom 223, Australia 153, China 149, United States 140, France 26, and Philippines 17.

The Soviet Union and Chinese Communist forces also held trials of Japanese war criminals. The Khabarovsk War Crime Trials held by the Soviets tried and found guilty some members of Japan's bacteriological and chemical warfare unit, also known as Unit 731. However, those who surrendered to the Americans were never brought to trial. As Supreme Commander for the Allied Powers, MacArthur gave immunity to Shiro Ishii and all members of the bacteriological research units in exchange for germ warfare data based on human experimentation. On May 6, 1947, he wrote to Washington that "additional data, possibly some statements from Ishii probably can be obtained by informing Japanese involved that information will be retained in intelligence channels and will not be employed as 'War Crimes' evidence." The deal was concluded in 1948.

Criticism

Charges of victors' justice
The United States had provided the funds and staff necessary for running the Tribunal and also held the function of Chief Prosecutor. The argument was made that it was difficult, if not impossible, to uphold the requirement of impartiality with which such an organ should be invested. This apparent conflict gave the impression that the tribunal was no more than a means for the dispensation of victors' justice. Solis Horowitz argues that IMTFE had an American bias: unlike the Nuremberg trials, there was only a single prosecution team, led by an American, although the members of the tribunal represented eleven different Allied countries. The IMTFE had less official support than the Nuremberg trials. Keenan, a former U.S. assistant attorney general, had a much lower position than Nuremberg's Robert H. Jackson, a justice of the U.S. Supreme Court.

Justice Jaranilla had been captured by the Japanese and walked the Bataan Death March. The defense sought to remove him from the bench claiming he would be unable to maintain objectivity. The request was rejected but Jaranilla did excuse himself from presentation of evidence for atrocities in his native country of the Philippines.

Justice Radhabinod Pal argued that the exclusion of Western colonialism and the atomic bombings of Hiroshima and Nagasaki from the list of crimes and the lack of judges from the vanquished nations on the bench signified the "failure of the Tribunal to provide anything other than the opportunity for the victors to retaliate". In this he was not alone among Indian jurists, with one prominent Calcutta barrister writing that the Tribunal was little more than "a sword in a [judge's] wig."

Justice Röling stated, "[o]f course, in Japan we were all aware of the bombings and the burnings of Tokyo and Yokohama and other big cities. It was horrible that we went there for the purpose of vindicating the laws of war, and yet saw every day how the Allies had violated them dreadfully."

However, in respect to Pal and Röling's statement about the conduct of air attacks, there was no positive or specific customary international humanitarian law with respect to aerial warfare before and during World War II. Ben Bruce Blakeney, an American defense counsel for Japanese defendants, argued that "[i]f the killing of Admiral Kidd by the bombing of Pearl Harbor is murder, we know the name of the very man who[se] hands loosed the atomic bomb on Hiroshima," although Pearl Harbor was classified as a war crime under the 1907 Hague Convention, as it happened without a declaration of war and without a just cause for self-defense. Prosecutors for Japanese war crimes once discussed prosecuting Japanese pilots involved in the bombing of Pearl Harbor for murder. However, they quickly dropped the idea after realizing there was no international law that protected neutral areas and nationals specifically from attack by aircraft.<ref group=nb>Article 39 of CHAPTER VI of the 1923 Hague Rules of Air Warfare stated:

Belligerent aircraft are bound to respect the rights of neutral Powers and to abstain within the jurisdiction of a neutral State from the commission of any act which it is the duty of that State to prevent.</blockquote>

However, the Hague Rules of Air Warfare was never formally adopted by every major power, and therefore never legally binding as international law.</ref>

Similarly, the indiscriminate bombing of Chinese cities by Japanese Imperial forces was never raised in the Tokyo Trials in fear of America being accused of the same thing for its air attacks on Japanese cities. As a result, Japanese pilots and officers were not prosecuted for their aerial raids on Pearl Harbor and cities in China and other Asian countries.

Pal's dissenting opinion

Indian jurist Radhabinod Pal raised substantive objections in a dissenting opinion: he found the entire prosecution case to be weak regarding the conspiracy to commit an act of aggressive war, which would include the brutalization and subjugation of conquered nations. About the Nanking Massacre—while acknowledging the brutality of the incident—he said that there was nothing to show that it was the "product of government policy" or that Japanese government officials were directly responsible. There is "no evidence, testimonial or circumstantial, concomitant, prospectant, restrospectant, that would in any way lead to the inference that the government in any way permitted the commission of such offenses," he said. In any case, he added, conspiracy to wage aggressive war was not illegal in 1937, or at any point since. In addition, Pal thought the refusal to try what he perceived as Allied crimes (particularly the use of atomic bombs) weakened the tribunal's authority. Recalling a letter by Kaiser Wilhelm II signalling his determination to bring World War I to a swift conclusion through brutal means if necessary, Pal stated that "This policy of indiscriminate murder to shorten the war was considered to be a crime. In the Pacific war under our consideration, if there was anything approaching what is indicated in the above letter of the German Emperor, it is the decision coming from the Allied powers to use the bomb", adding that "Future generations will judge this dire decision". Pal was the only judge to argue for the acquittal of all of the defendants.

Exoneration of the imperial family
The Japanese emperor Hirohito and other members of the imperial family might have been regarded as potential suspects. They included career officer Prince Yasuhiko Asaka, Prince Fushimi Hiroyasu, Prince Higashikuni, and Prince Takeda. Herbert Bix explained, "The Truman Administration and General MacArthur both believed the occupation reforms would be implemented smoothly if they used Hirohito to legitimise their changes."

As early as November 26, 1945, MacArthur confirmed to Admiral Mitsumasa Yonai that the emperor's abdication would not be necessary. Before the war crimes trials actually convened, SCAP, the International Prosecution Section (IPS), and court officials worked behind the scenes not only to prevent the imperial family from being indicted, but also to skew the testimony of the defendants to ensure that no one implicated the emperor. High officials in court circles and the Japanese government collaborated with Allied GHQ in compiling lists of prospective war criminals. People arrested as Class A suspects and incarcerated in the Sugamo Prison solemnly vowed to protect their sovereign against any possible taint of war responsibility.

According to historian Herbert Bix, Brigadier General Bonner Fellers "immediately on landing in Japan went to work to protect Hirohito from the role he had played during and at the end of the war" and "allowed the major criminal suspects to coordinate their stories so that the emperor would be spared from indictment."

Bix also argues that "MacArthur's truly extraordinary measures to save Hirohito from trial as a war criminal had a lasting and profoundly distorting impact on Japanese understanding of the lost war" and "months before the Tokyo tribunal commenced, MacArthur's highest subordinates were working to attribute ultimate responsibility for Pearl Harbor to Hideki Tōjō." According to a written report by Shūichi Mizota, Admiral Mitsumasa Yonai's interpreter, Fellers met the two men at his office on March 6, 1946, and told Yonai, "It would be most convenient if the Japanese side could prove to us that the emperor is completely blameless. I think the forthcoming trials offer the best opportunity to do that. Tōjō, in particular, should be made to bear all responsibility at this trial."

Historian John W. Dower wrote that the campaign to absolve Emperor Hirohito of responsibility "knew no bounds." He argued that with MacArthur's full approval, the prosecution effectively acted as "a defense team for the emperor," who was presented as "an almost saintly figure" let alone someone culpable of war crimes. He stated, "Even Japanese activists who endorse the ideals of the Nuremberg and Tokyo charters and who have labored to document and publicize the atrocities of the Shōwa regime cannot defend the American decision to exonerate the emperor of war responsibility and then, in the chill of the Cold War, release and soon afterwards openly embrace accused right-winged war criminals like the later prime minister Nobusuke Kishi."

Three justices wrote an obiter dictum about the criminal responsibility of Hirohito. Judge-in-Chief Webb declared, "No ruler can commit the crime of launching aggressive war and then validly claim to be excused for doing so because his life would otherwise have been in danger ... It will remain that the men who advised the commission of a crime, if it be one, are in no worse position than the man who directs the crime be committed."

Justice Henri Bernard of France concluded that Japan's declaration of war "had a principal author who escaped all prosecution and of whom in any case the present Defendants could only be considered as accomplices."

Justice Röling did not find the emperor's immunity objectionable and further argued that five defendants (Kido, Hata, Hirota, Shigemitsu, and Tōgō) should have been acquitted.

Failure to prosecute perpetrators of inhumane medical experimentation
Shirō Ishii, commander of Unit 731, received immunity in exchange for data gathered from his experiments on live prisoners. In 1981 John W. Powell published an article in the Bulletin of the Atomic Scientists detailing the experiments of Unit 731 and its open-air tests of germ warfare on civilians. It was printed with a statement by Judge Röling, the last surviving member of the Tokyo Tribunal, who wrote, "As one of the judges in the International Military Tribunal, it is a bitter experience for me to be informed now that centrally ordered Japanese war criminality of the most disgusting kind was kept secret from the Court by the U.S. government".

Failure to prosecute other suspects
Forty-two suspects, such as Nobusuke Kishi, who later became Prime Minister, and Yoshisuke Aikawa, head of Nissan, were imprisoned in the expectation that they would be prosecuted at a second Tokyo Tribunal but they were never charged. They were released in 1947 and 1948.

Aftermath

Release of the remaining 42 "Class A" suspects

The International Prosecution Section (IPS) of the SCAP decided to try the seventy Japanese apprehended for "Class A" war crimes in three groups. The first group of 28 were major leaders in the military, political, and diplomatic sphere. The second group (23 people) and the third group (nineteen people) were industrial and financial magnates who had been engaged in weapons manufacturing industries or were accused of trafficking in narcotics, as well as a number of lesser known leaders in military, political, and diplomatic spheres. The most notable among these were:
 Nobusuke Kishi: In charge of industry and commerce of Manchukuo, 1936–40; Minister of Industry and Commerce under Tojo administration.
 Fusanosuke Kuhara: Leader of the pro-Zaibatsu faction of Rikken Seiyukai.
 Yoshisuke Ayukawa: Sworn brother of Fusanosuke Kuhara, founder of Japan Industrial Corporation; went to Manchuria after the Mukden Incident (1931), at the invitation of his relative Nobusuke Kishi, where he founded the Manchurian Heavy Industry Development Company.
 Toshizō Nishio: Chief of Staff of the Kwantung Army, Commander-in-Chief of China Expeditionary Army, 1939–41; war-time Minister of Education.
 Kisaburō Andō: Garrison Commander of Port Arthur and Minister of Interior in the Tojo cabinet.
 Yoshio Kodama: A radical ultranationalist. War profiteer, smuggler and underground crime boss.
 Ryōichi Sasakawa: Ultranationalist businessman and philanthropist.
 Kazuo Aoki: Administrator of Manchurian affairs; Minister of Treasury in Nobuyoki Abe's cabinet; followed Abe to China as an advisor; Minister of Greater East Asia in the Tojo cabinet.
 Masayuki Tani: Ambassador to Manchukuo, Minister of Foreign Affairs and concurrently Director of the Intelligence Bureau; Ambassador to the Reorganized National Government of China.
 Eiji Amo: Chief of the Intelligence Section of Ministry of Foreign Affairs; Deputy Minister of Foreign Affairs; Director of Intelligence Bureau in the Tojo cabinet.
 Yakichiro Suma: Consul General at Nanking; in 1938, he served as counselor at the Japanese Embassy in Washington; after 1941, Minister Plenipotentiary to Spain.

All remaining people apprehended and accused of Class A war crimes who had not yet come to trial were set free by MacArthur in 1947 and 1948.

San Francisco Peace Treaty
Under Article 11 of the San Francisco Peace Treaty, signed on September 8, 1951, Japan accepted the jurisdiction of the International Military Tribunal for the Far East. Article 11 of the treaty reads:

Parole for war criminals movement

In 1950, after most Allied war crimes trials had ended, thousands of convicted war criminals sat in prisons across Asia and Europe, detained in the countries where they had been convicted. Some executions had not yet been carried out, as Allied courts agreed to reexamine their verdicts. Sentences were reduced in some cases, and a system of parole was instituted, but without relinquishing control over the fate of the imprisoned (even after Japan and Germany had regained their sovereignty).

The focus changed from the top wartime leaders to "ordinary" war criminals (Class B and C in Japan), and an intense campaign for amnesty for all imprisoned war criminals ensued which enjoyed widespread public support. The campaign reframed the issue of criminal responsibility as a humanitarian problem.

On March 7, 1950, MacArthur issued a directive that reduced the sentences by one-third for good behavior and authorized the parole after fifteen years of those who had received life sentences. Several of those who were imprisoned were released earlier on parole due to ill health.

Many Japanese reacted to the Tokyo War Crimes Tribunal by demanding parole for the detainees or mitigation of their sentences. Shortly after the San Francisco Peace Treaty came into effect, a movement demanding the release of B- and C-class war criminals began, emphasizing the "unfairness of the war crimes tribunals" and the "misery and hardship of the families of war criminals." The movement quickly garnered the support of more than ten million Japanese. The government commented that "public sentiment in our country is that the war criminals are not criminals. Rather, they gather great sympathy as victims of the war, and the number of people concerned about the war crimes tribunal system itself is steadily increasing."

The parole for war criminals movement was driven by two groups: people who had "a sense of pity" for the prisoners demanded, "Just set them free" (tonikaku shakuho o) regardless of how it is done. The war criminals themselves called for their own release as part of an anti-war peace movement.

On September 4, 1952, President Truman issued Executive Order 10393, establishing a Clemency and Parole Board for War Criminals. Its purpose was to advise the President regarding recommendations by the Government of Japan for clemency, reduction of sentence, or parole of Japanese war criminals sentenced by military tribunals.

On May 26, 1954, Secretary of State John Foster Dulles rejected a proposed amnesty for the imprisoned war criminals but instead agreed to "change the ground rules" by reducing the period required for eligibility for parole from 15 years to 10 years.

By the end of 1958, all Japanese war criminals were released from prison and politically rehabilitated. Hashimoto Kingorô, Hata Shunroku, Minami Jirô, and Oka Takazumi were all released on parole in 1954. Araki Sadao, Hiranuma Kiichirô, Hoshino Naoki, Kaya Okinori, Kido Kôichi, Ôshima Hiroshi, Shimada Shigetarô, and Suzuki Teiichi were released on parole in 1955. Satô Kenryô was not granted parole until March 1956, the last of the Class A Japanese war criminals to be released. With the concurrence of a majority of the powers represented on the tribunal, the Japanese government announced on April 7, 1957, that the last ten major Japanese war criminals who had previously been paroled were granted clemency and were to be regarded henceforth as unconditionally free.

Legacy
In 1978, the kami of 1,068 convicted war criminals, including the kami of 14 convicted Class-A war criminals, were secretly enshrined in the Yasukuni Shrine. Those enshrined include Hideki Tōjō, Kenji Doihara, Iwane Matsui, Heitarō Kimura, Kōki Hirota, Seishirō Itagaki, Akira Mutō, Yosuke Matsuoka, Osami Nagano, Toshio Shiratori, Kiichirō Hiranuma, Kuniaki Koiso and Yoshijirō Umezu. Since 1985, visits made by Japanese government officials to the Shrine have aroused protests in China and South Korea.

Arnold Brackman, who had covered the trials for United Press International, wrote The Other Nuremberg: The Untold Story of the Tokyo War Crimes Trial, a rebuttal of charges that the trial had been "victor's justice"; this rebuttal was posthumously published in 1987, four years after Arnold Brackman's death.

In a survey of 3,000 Japanese people which was conducted by Asahi News as the 60th anniversary of the start of the trial approached in 2006, 70% of those who were questioned were unaware of the details of the trial, a figure that rose to 90% among those who were in the 20–29 age group. Some 76% of the people who were polled recognized the fact that a degree of the aggression which was perpetrated during the war was perpetrated by Japan, while only 7% of them believed that the war was a war which was strictly waged for the purpose of self-defense.

A South Korean government commission cleared 83 of the 148 Koreans who were convicted of war crimes by the Allies. The commission ruled that the Koreans, who were categorized as Class B and Class C war criminals, were actually victims of Japanese imperialism.

Potential concerns expressed by the Japanese Imperial Family
Some time before the situation emerged about his expected accession to the Chrysanthemum Throne at the end of April 2019, some degree of concern was voiced by the then Crown Prince Naruhito on the occasion of his 55th birthday in February 2015 about how Japanese history with regard to its involvement in World War II would be remembered by his future subjects; as Naruhito put it at that time: it was "important to look back on the past humbly and correctly," in reference to Japan's role in World War II-era war crimes and that he was concerned about the ongoing need to, in his own words: "correctly pass down tragic experiences and the history behind Japan to the generations who have no direct knowledge of the war, at the time memories of the war are about to fade."

List of judges, prosecutors, and defendants

Judges
MacArthur appointed a panel of 11 judges, nine from the nations that signed the Instrument of Surrender.

Legal scholar Roscoe Pound was also apparently favourably disposed to replacing John P. Higgins as a judge, but his appointment did not eventuate.

Prosecutors
The chief prosecutor, Joseph B. Keenan of the United States, was appointed by President Harry S. Truman.

Defendants

Twenty-eight defendants were charged, mostly military officers and government officials.

Civilian officials
 Kōki Hirota, prime minister (1936–37), foreign minister (1933–36, 1937–38)
 Kiichirō Hiranuma, prime minister (1939), president of the privy council
 Naoki Hoshino, chief cabinet secretary
 Kōichi Kido, Lord Keeper of the Privy Seal
 Toshio Shiratori, Ambassador to Italy
 Shigenori Tōgō, foreign minister (1941–42, 1945)
 Mamoru Shigemitsu, foreign minister (1943–45)
 Okinori Kaya, finance minister (1941–44)
 Yōsuke Matsuoka, foreign minister (1940–41)

Military officers
 General Hideki Tōjō, prime minister (1941–44), war minister (1940–44), chief of the Imperial Japanese Army General Staff Office (1944)
 General Sadao Araki, war minister (1931–34)
 General Kenji Doihara, chief of the intelligence service in Manchukuo
 Colonel Kingorō Hashimoto, founder of Sakurakai
 Field Marshal Shunroku Hata, war minister (1939–40)
 General Seishirō Itagaki, war minister (1938–39)
 General Heitarō Kimura, commander of the Burma Area Army
 General Kuniaki Koiso, prime minister (1944–45), governor-general of Korea (1942–44)
 General Iwane Matsui, commander of the Shanghai Expeditionary Force and Central China Area Army
 General Jirō Minami, governor-general of Korea (1936–42)
 Lieutenant General Akira Mutō, chief of staff of the 14th Area Army
 Fleet Admiral Osami Nagano, navy minister (1936–37), chief of the Imperial Japanese Navy General Staff (1941–44)
 Vice Admiral Takazumi Oka, chief of the Bureau of Naval Affairs
 Lieutenant General Hiroshi Ōshima, ambassador to Germany
 Lieutenant General Kenryō Satō, chief of the Military Affairs Bureau
 Admiral Shigetarō Shimada, navy minister (1941–44), chief of the Imperial Japanese Navy General Staff (1944)
 Lieutenant General Teiichi Suzuki, chief of the Cabinet Planning Board
 General Yoshijirō Umezu, commander of the Kwantung Army, chief of the Imperial Japanese Army General Staff Office (1944–45)

Other defendants
 Shūmei Ōkawa, a political philosopher

See also

 Allied war crimes during World War II
 Bangka Island massacre
 Bataan Death March
 Comfort women
 Indian National Army trials
 Japanese war crimes
 Justice Erima Harvey Northcroft Tokyo War Crimes Trial Collection
 Khabarovsk war crimes trials
 Manila massacre
 Nanjing Massacre
 Nanjing War Crimes Tribunal
 Nanking: A 2007 Chinese film about the Nanjing Massacre.
 The Rape of Nanking (book): a book about the Nanjing Massacre which was written by Iris Chang, the book was published in the United States by Basic Books in 1997, the sixtieth anniversary of the start of the Nanjing Massacre 
 Philippine War Crimes Commission
 Sugamo Prison
 Unit 731
 Yokohama War Crimes Trials
 プライド運命の瞬間 ("Praido", Pride): A 1998 Japanese film about the trial.
 The Tokyo Trial: A 2006 Chinese film about the trial.
 Tokyo Trial: a 2016 miniseries

References

Notes

Books

Web

Film
 Judging Japan (a 2016 documentary by Tim B. Toidze) IMDB link

Further reading

External links
 University of Virginia The International Military Tribunal for the Far East Digital Collection The International Military Tribunal for the Far East
 Legal Tools, Other International(ised) Criminal Jurisdictions, International Military Tribunal for the Far East (IMTFE) ICC Legal Tools
 Zachary D. Kaufman, "Transitional Justice for Tojo's Japan: the United States Role in the Establishment of the International Military Tribunal for the Far East and Other Transitional Justice Mechanisms for Japan after World War II" Emory International Law Review, vol. 27 (2013)
 

 
War crimes organizations
Crimes against humanity
Crime of aggression
Wartime sexual violence in World War II
Military history of the United Kingdom during World War II
1946 in law
1947 in law
1948 in law
Courts and tribunals established in 1946
Courts and tribunals disestablished in 1948
International courts and tribunals